Ilmi is a given name and surname. Notable people with the name include:
Ilmi Hallsten (1862–1936), Finnish teacher and politician
Ilmi Kolla (1933–1954), Estonian poet
Ilmi Parkkari (1926–1979), Finnish actress
 (born 1935), Estonian mycologist
Shazia Ilmi (born 1970), Indian politician

Estonian feminine given names
Finnish feminine given names